DJ Sashimi is a Japanese DJ, musician, J-Pop artist whose first single "Japanese Girl in NY" was released by Good Charamel Records in 2010. The single Japanese Girl in NY was also included in Volume 1 of the I Love J Rock compilations. DJ Sashimi is produced by Goo Goo Dolls bassist Robby Takac. DJ Sashimi has performed sets at The Music is Art Festival in Buffalo, NY and opening slots for Shonen Knife and CJ Ramone. DJ Sashimi is currently working on her first release in nearly 8 years at Buffalo, NY's GCR Audio Recording Studios for release in Spring of 2018.

Discography
 Japanese Girl in NY (Single) (2010)
 Smooth Sashimi (Michael Jackson Remix) (2018)
 Sakura Sakura (2018)

References

 http://www.djsashimi.com
 https://www.goodcharamel.com/dj-sashimi.html
 https://www.reverbnation.com/djsashimi
 http://www.bostonbastardbrigade.com/2014/09/no-borders-no-race-episode-roku-juu-go
 http://bigtakeover.com/recordings/i-love-j-rock-good-charamel-records
 https://mvdb2b.com/s/ILoveJRock/GC022
 https://blog.musicremedy.com/post/1005778454/who-loves-j-rock-good-charamel-records-does
 http://lpr.com/lpr_events/shonen-knife-cj-ramone-june-22nd-2015/
 http://absolutegoo.com/inquisitr-goo-goo-dolls-robby-takac-running-studio-record-label-non-profit-father-bandmate/

External links
 DJSashimi.com 
 DJ Sashimi Reverb Nation Page 
 DJ Sashimi Good Charamel Records Page 

Year of birth missing (living people)
Living people
Japanese DJs